Vamsam is a 2010 Indian Tamil-language action film, starring debutante Arulnidhi and Sunaina in lead roles. The film is produced by Arulnidhi's father and M. Karunanidhi's youngest son, M. K. Thamizharasu, and features Jayaprakash, Ganja Karuppu, Kishore, Anupama Kumar among others in supporting roles. The film released on 13 August 2010 to positive reviews and became a profitable venture at the box-office.

Cast
 Arulnidhi as Anbarasu - Malarkodi's husband.
 Sunaina as Malarkodi - Anbarasu's wife.
 Jayaprakash as Seenikannu Devar
 Ganja Karuppu as Sombhu Mani
 Kishore as Rowdi Rathinam
 Anupama Kumar as Meenakshi
 Myna Nandhini as Sarasu
 Kumar
 Hello Kandasamy

Production
Arulnidhi's cousin Udhayanidhi Stalin was initially offered a lead role in the film however he turned down the opportunity fearing he would not suit the role.

Soundtrack

Soundtrack contains six songs composed by Taj Noor, an assistant of A. R. Rahman who made his debut as composer with this film. Directors Sasikumar and Samuthirakani made their debut as playback singers with this film.

Reception
Behindwoods wrote "Pandiraj is successful in showcasing the life of a community in its various facets which could be interesting to some. He has fused realism and cinematic elements in the right proportion and has sliced his way through the path less trodden with considerable aplomb this time also." Rediff wrote "Vamsam is an intriguing tale of the clash of clans, but it suffers from overkill."

References

External links

2010 films
Indian action drama films
2010s Tamil-language films
Films directed by Pandiraj
2010 action drama films